was a Japanese press photographer.

Nagao is best known for his photograph of Otoya Yamaguchi assassinating Japanese Socialist Party politician Inejiro Asanuma. At the time Nagao was a cameraman working for Mainichi Shimbun; Hisatake Abo, Nagao's picture editor, told Nagao to cover a debate at Hibiya Hall. As Yamaguchi challenged Asanuma, Nagao changed the focus to fifteen feet from ten feet.

Nagao won the 1960 World Press Photo of the Year award and the 1961 Pulitzer Prize. The first award allowed Nagao to travel abroad widely, impossible for most Japanese people at the time.

Nagao left the newspaper in 1962 and became a freelance photographer.

Nagao was discovered collapsed in his bathroom on 2 May 2009. It is believed he died of natural causes.

Notes

External links
Faber, John. Great News Photos and the Stories Behind Them. 2nd ed. New York: Dover, 1978. . Google Books.

Japanese photographers
People from Tokyo
Pulitzer Prize for Photography winners
1930 births
2009 deaths